Jim Grabb and Jonathan Stark were the defending champions but only Grabb competed that year with Richey Reneberg.

Grabb and Reneberg lost in the first round to Todd Woodbridge and Mark Woodforde.

Woodbridge and Woodforde won in the final 7–6, 6–2 against Byron Black and Grant Connell.

Seeds

  Todd Woodbridge /  Mark Woodforde (champions)
  Patrick Galbraith /  Paul Haarhuis (semifinals)
  Byron Black /  Grant Connell (final)
  Rick Leach /  Scott Melville (semifinals)

Draw

References
 1996 Comcast U.S. Indoor Doubles Draw

U.S. Pro Indoor
1996 ATP Tour